This is a list of schools in the Borough of Halton in Cheshire, England.

State-funded schools

Primary schools

All Saints Upton CE Primary School, Widnes
Astmoor Primary School, Astmoor
Beechwood Primary School, Beechwood
Bridgewater Park Primary School, Runcorn
Brookvale Primary School, Runcorn
The Brow Community Primary School, Halton
Castle View Primary School, Halton
Daresbury Primary School, Daresbury
Ditton Primary School, Ditton
Fairfield Primary School, Widnes
Farnworth CE Primary School, Widnes
Gorsewood Primary School, Runcorn
The Grange Academy, Runcorn
Hale CE Primary School, Hale Village
Halebank CE Primary School, Halebank
Hallwood Park Primary School and Nursery, Runcorn
Halton Lodge Primary School, Halton
Hillview Primary School, Beechwood
The Holy Spirit RC Primary School, Halton
Kingsway Primary Academy, Widnes
Lunts Heath Primary School, Widnes
Moore Primary School, Moore
Moorfield Primary School, Widnes
Murdishaw West Community Primary School, Runcorn
Oakfield Community Primary School, Widnes
Our Lady Mother of the Saviour RC Primary School, Runcorn
Our Lady of Perpetual Succour RC Primary School, Widnes
Palace Fields Primary Academy, Runcorn
Pewithall Primary School, Runcorn
Runcorn All Saints CE Primary School, Runcorn
St Augustine's RC Primary School, Runcorn
St Basil's RC Primary School, Hough Green
St Bede's Catholic Infant School, Widnes
St Bede's Catholic Junior School, Widnes
St Berteline's CE Primary School, Norton
St Clement's RC Primary School, Runcorn
St Edward's RC Primary School, Runcorn
St Gerard's RC Primary and Nursery School, Widnes
St John Fisher Catholic Primary School, Widnes
St Martin's RC Primary School, Runcorn
St Mary's CE Primary School, Runcorn
St Michael with St Thomas CE Primary School, Hough Green
St Michael's RC Primary School, Widnes
Victoria Road Primary School, Runcorn
Westfield Primary School, Runcorn
Weston Point Community Primary School, Runcorn
Weston Primary School, Weston
Widnes Academy, Widnes
Windmill Hill Primary School, Runcorn
Woodside Primary School, Runcorn

Secondary schools

The Grange Academy, Runcorn
The Heath School, Runcorn
Ormiston Bolingbroke Academy, Runcorn
Ormiston Chadwick Academy, Widnes
St Chad's Catholic and Church of England Academy, Runcorn
Saints Peter and Paul Catholic High School, Widnes
Sandymoor Ormiston Academy, Runcorn
Wade Deacon High School, Widnes

Special and alternative schools
Ashley High School, Widnes
The Bridge School, Astmoor
Brookfields School, Widnes
The Cavendish High Academy, Runcorn
Chesnut Lodge Special School, Ditton

Further education
Riverside College, Halton

Independent schools

Special and alternative schools
Halton School, Halton
Hope Corner School, Runcorn
Weston Point College, Runcorn

Performance table
This table shows the percentage of pupils gaining five GCSE A*–C level grades, including English and Maths, in the years 2005–2008 compared with the local and national averages.

Ofsted reports
The key for the inspection grades in the table are: Grade 1 Outstanding: Grade 2 Good: Grade 3 Satisfactory: Grade 4 Inadequate

References 

Halton
Schools in the Borough of Halton